Alveringem is a municipality located in the Belgian province of West Flanders. The municipality comprises the towns of Alveringem proper, Beveren-aan-de-IJzer, Gijverinkhove, Hoogstade, Izenberge, Leisele, Oeren, Sint-Rijkers and Stavele. On January 1, 2006, Alveringem had a total population of 4,887. The total area is 80.01 km² which gives a population density of 61 inhabitants per km². The mayor of Alveringem is Gerard Liefooghe (Gemeentebelangen) since 2006.

Cyriel Verschaeve was as a priest attached to the parish of Alveringem and re-buried near Alveringem's church in 1973.

Towns
The municipality of Alveringem has a relatively low population density and the number of inhabitants has still decreased last decades. The extensive territory comprises nine rural towns or deelgemeentes. The largest town is Alveringem proper, the chief town, located in the northeast of the municipality. During the merger of municipalities in 1971, the villages Hoogstade, Oeren and Sint-Rijkers were added to Alveringem. In 1977, Leisele and Stavele, independent municipalities at the time, were added as well. As from 1971, Leisele also comprised the villages Gijverinkhove and Izenberge; Beveren-aan-de-IJzer was a part of Stavele. So, since 1977, the new extended municipality comprised the nine rural deelgemeentes.

(*) The population of the small villages of Oeren and Sint-Rijkers is contained in the number for Alveringem proper
Source: Streekplatform Westhoek https://web.archive.org/web/20070928072054/http://www.westhoek.be/streekplatform/Tabellen/3.2..htm 

Due to its rural extent, the municipality of Alvergem borders a large number of small villages:

Map

References

External links

Official website  - Available only in Dutch

 
Municipalities of West Flanders